Luka Okros (born Luka Okrostsvaridze / ) was born on 19 March 1991, Tbilisi, Georgia and is now based in London. Georgian concert pianist, published composer and Instagram influencer. Luka Okros has won several major piano awards, including 1st prizes in both Hong Kong International Piano Competition and Valencia Iturbi Prize International Piano Competition. By the age of 26, Luka had performed in over 40 countries. He made his Georgian debut aged just 5 years old and his US debut at age 18 at the Carnegie Hall. Luka's compositions and arrangements are published by Master Music Publications.

Education 

Luka Okros graduated with a bachelor's degree at the Tchaikovsky Conservatory under the tutelage of Sergei Dorensky and a master's degree at the Royal College of Music where he studied with Norma Fisher.

Awards 

Luka Okros has been recorded and broadcast numerous times on BBC Radio 3, France Musique, Hong Kong Radio 4 and Georgian Radio 1.

Compositions 
For Solo Piano

Preludes Op. 2 (2015) 
No. 1 
No. 2
No. 3 
No. 4 
Intermezzo Op. 3 No. 1 (2018)  - Debuted at the Concertgebouw, Amsterdam on 1st June 2019 by Luka Okros
Nostalgia Op. 3 No. 2 (2020) 
Dream Op. 3 No. 3 (2020) 
Fantasy in F minor

For ensemble
Piano Trio

Arrangements
Paliashvili’s Ballet (Lekuri and Mirzaia) from Abesalom & Eteri for Solo Piano

References

External links 
Official website: https://www.lukaokros.com
https://www.pressreader.com/canada/national-post-latest-edition/20070509/281986078121670
http://www.vesti.ru/videos/show/vid/494640/#

1991 births
Living people
Moscow Conservatory alumni
Pianists from Georgia (country)
Alumni of the Royal College of Music
21st-century pianists